The ninth season of Family Guy first aired on the Fox network in eighteen episodes from September 26, 2010, to May 22, 2011, before being released as two DVD box sets and in syndication. Family Guy follows the dysfunctional Griffin family—father Peter, mother Lois, daughter Meg, son Chris, baby Stewie and dog Brian, all of whom reside in their hometown of Quahog. 

Season nine was the debut of the series' eighth production season, which was executive produced by Chris Sheridan, David Goodman, Danny Smith, Mark Hentemann, Steve Callaghan and series creator Seth MacFarlane. The season's showrunners were Hentemann and Callaghan.

The season received a mixed reception from critics, who called it "a mixture of laugh out loud gags, groan inducing puns, and astonishing 'I can’t believe they got away with that' statements." Season nine contains some of the series' most acclaimed episodes, including "And Then There Were Fewer", "Road to the North Pole" and "New Kidney in Town", as well as some of the most controversial episodes, including "And I'm Joyce Kinney", "Friends of Peter G.", and "The Hand That Rocks the Wheelchair". This season marks the first time Family Guy aired in 720p high-definition and widescreen with a remastered title sequence. It was nominated for a Primetime Emmy Award for Outstanding Music Composition for a Series, Outstanding Original Music and
Lyrics and Outstanding Sound Mixing for a Comedy or Drama Series and Animation.

The Volume Nine DVD box set was released in Region 1 on December 13, 2011, and was released in Region 2 on May 9, 2011 (titled Season 10) and Region 4 on June 15, 2011. Three of the eighteen episodes are included in the volume. The remaining fourteen episodes were included in the Volume Ten DVD box set, released in Region 2 on November 3, 2011, titled Season 11, Region 4 on February 29, 2012, and finally on Region 1 on September 24, 2012. One other episode, "It's a Trap!", was released independently on DVD.

In the UK, the debut episodes were shown on Sunday nights from May to July 2011 on BBC Three. These repeated the Saturday after, although re-runs of the series continue to be shown on the channel nightly.

Production
Production for the ninth season began in 2009, during the airing of the eighth season. The season was executive produced by series regulars Chris Sheridan, David Goodman, Danny Smith, Mark Hentemann and Steve Callaghan, along with series creator Seth MacFarlane. The showrunners for the ninth season were Hentemann and Callaghan, who oversaw the series's transition into 720p high definition in the premiere of the ninth-season episode "And Then There Were Fewer".

As production began, Callaghan, Andrew Goldberg, Mark Hentemann, Patrick Meighan, Brian Scully, Chris Sheridan, Danny Smith, Alec Sulkin, John Viener and Wellesley Wild all stayed on from the previous season. Matt Harrigan, Dave Willis, Anthony Blasucci and Mike Desilets received their first writing credit for the series. Series executive producer David A. Goodman returned as a writer for the series, with Goodman leaving immediately afterward to work on the Fox animated series Allen Gregory. Kirker Butler, who wrote five episodes for the show, left the series before the beginning of the ninth season, in order to write for the Fox animated series The Cleveland Show, a spin-off of Family Guy. Writer John Viener left the series at the end of the season to also write for The Cleveland Show. Recurring directors Dominic Bianchi, Greg Colton, John Holmquist, Brian Iles, Jerry Langford, Pete Michels, James Purdum, Cyndi Tang and Julius Wu all stayed with the show from the previous season. Peter Shin briefly returned to the series as a director to direct the sequel to the episode "Something, Something, Something, Dark Side", entitled "It's a Trap!". Shin also served as supervising director for the season, along with James Purdum.

The main cast consisted of Seth MacFarlane (Peter Griffin, Stewie Griffin, Brian Griffin, Quagmire and Tom Tucker, among others), Alex Borstein (Lois Griffin, Loretta Brown, Tricia Takanawa and Barbara Pewterschmidt, among others), Mila Kunis (Meg Griffin), Seth Green (Chris Griffin and Neil Goldman, among others) and Mike Henry (Cleveland Brown and Herbert, among others).

Episodes

Home media
The remaining episodes of the eighth season and the first three episodes of the ninth season were released on DVD by 20th Century Fox in the United States and Canada on December 13, 2011. The DVD release features bonus material including four featurettes, "Who Done It? The Making of 'And Then There Were Fewer'", "Brian & Stewie: The Lost Phone Call", "The History of the World According to Family Guy" and the Family Guy panel at the 2010 San Diego Comic-Con International, along with audio commentaries, animatics and deleted scenes.

References

External links

Family Guy (season 9) episodes
Family Guy seasons
2010 American television seasons
2011 American television seasons